"The Song of the Shirt" is a poem written by Thomas Hood in 1843.

It was written in honour of a Mrs. Biddell, a widow and seamstress living in wretched conditions. In what was, at that time, common practice, Mrs. Biddell sewed trousers and shirts in her home using materials given to her by her employer for which she was forced to give a £2 deposit. In a desperate attempt to feed her starving infants, Mrs. Biddell pawned the clothing she had made, thus accruing a debt she could not pay. Mrs. Biddell, whose first name has not been recorded, was sent to a workhouse, and her ultimate fate is unknown; however, her story became a catalyst for those who actively opposed the wretched conditions of England’s working poor, who often spent seven days a week labouring under inhumane conditions, barely managing to survive and with no prospect for relief.

The poem was published anonymously in the Christmas edition of Punch in 1843 and quickly became a phenomenon, centering people’s attention not only on Mrs. Biddell's case, but on the conditions of workers in general. Though Hood was not politically radical, his work, like that of Charles Dickens, contributed to the general awareness of the condition of the working class which fed the popularity of trade unionism and the push for stricter labour laws.

Following is the first stanza of the poem; for the complete text, see the Wikisource link below.

With fingers weary and worn,
With eyelids heavy and red,
A woman sat in unwomanly rags,
Plying her needle and thread – 
Stitch! Stitch! Stitch! 
In poverty, hunger, and dirt,
And still with a voice of dolorous pitch 
She sang ‘The Song of the Shirt!’

References 

 Sheila Blackburn, A Fair Day’s Wage for a Fair Day’s Work? ( London: Ashgate Press, 2007)
 Walter Jerrold, Thomas Hood: His Life and Times (London: Alston Rivers, 1907)

External links

1843 poems
British poems
Works originally published in Punch (magazine)